Lomnice nad Lužnicí is a town in Jindřichův Hradec District in the South Bohemian Region of the Czech Republic. It has about 1,800 inhabitants.

Geography
It lies in the Třeboň Basin and in the Třeboňsko Protected Landscape Area. The river Lužnice flows east of the town and forms a small part of the municipal border. Velký Tisý, one of the largest ponds in the Czech Republic, is located in the municipal territory, along with several smaller ponds.

History
The first written mention of Lomnice is from 1220. Probably around 1250, a castle was built here. The settlement was promoted to a town in 1382 by King Wenceslaus IV. From 1435 to 1611, it was property of the Rosenberg family. During this era, Lomnice prospered and many fish ponds were established in the vicinity of the town.

Since 1789, the town has been named Lomnice nad Lužnicí, although the river Lužnice flows further from the town.

Sights

The Church of Saint Wenceslaus was built in 1359, originally as castle chapel of the Corpus Christi and Saints Peter and Paul. More extensive reconstructions were made in 1635 and 1645, after the church was damaged during the Thirty Years' War, and the church was consecrated to Saint Wenceslaus. Despite several reconstructions, it still has a Gothic floor plan.

The Church of Sain John the Baptist was built in 1358 on the site of a shrine that stood here before the castle was built. The tower was rebuilt into the Neo-Gothic style in 1872.

Twin towns – sister cities

Lomnice nad Lužnicí is twinned with:
 Bad Großpertholz, Austria
 Dießen am Ammersee, Germany

References

External links

 

Cities and towns in the Czech Republic
Populated places in Jindřichův Hradec District